Donald Ray Mello (born June 22, 1934), was an American politician who was a Democratic member of the Nevada General Assembly. He is an alumnus of the University of Nevada-Reno and the B.F. Goodrich Management School. Mello is a former conductor with the Southern Pacific Transportation Company.

References

1934 births
Living people
Democratic Party members of the Nevada Assembly
Democratic Party Nevada state senators
Politicians from Owensboro, Kentucky